The dorsal pancreatic artery is a branch of the splenic artery. It anastomoses with the superior pancreaticoduodenal artery and continues as the inferior pancreatic artery on its lower border.

Anatomy 
The dorsal pancreatic artery is a short artery that issues numerous branches. It's course and length depends upon its (variable) origin.

Origin 
The dorsal pancreatic artery usually arises from (the proximal 2cm of) the splenic artery. It may also arise from the common hepatic artery, superior mesenteric artery, or coeliac trunck.

Fate 
It consistently terminates near the inferior border of the pancreas, near to the origin of the portal vein.

References

External links
 

Arteries of the abdomen